Bhadarwahi is an Indo-Aryan language of the Western Pahari group spoken in the Bhaderwah region of Jammu and Kashmir, India.

The name Bhadarwahi can be understood either in a narrow sense as referring to the dialect, locally known as Bhiḍlāi, native to the Bhadarwah valley, or in a broader sense to cover the group of related dialects spoken in the wider region where Bhadarwahi proper is used as a lingua franca. In addition to Bhadarwahi proper, this group also includes Padri, Bhalesi, and Khasali (Khashali) dialect. The  Churahi language is closely related.

Variants include Bhaderwahi, Baderwali, Bhadri, Badrohi, Bhadlayi, and Bhadlai.

Phonology 

According to Masica (1991) there are a set of lateral retroflex affricates /ʈ͡ꞎ ɖ͡ɭ ɖ͡ɭʱ/ from old /Cr/ clusters.

Status 
The language is commonly called Pahari. Some speaker may even call it a dialect of Dogri. The language has no official status. According to the United Nations Education, Scientific and Cultural Organisation (UNESCO), the language is of definitely endangered category, i.e. many Bhadravahi parents are not teaching this language to the children with which the number of  its native speakers is decreasing. Some other languages, such as Kashmiri and Urdu/Hindi are taking this place. This is an archetypical natural human tendency of picking up the language of people placed better economically and socially.

Notable events

A daily news headlines program is broadcast by a news outlet The Chenab Times in Sarazi and Bhaderwahi languages to promote them.

References

Sources
 

Languages of Jammu and Kashmir
Endangered languages of India